CCK1 may refer to:
 CCL28, chemokine
 Cholecystokinin A receptor, GPCR